Swamplight is an adventure for the 2nd edition of the Advanced Dungeons & Dragons fantasy role-playing game, published in 1993.

Publication history
The module was written by Jean Rabe and published by TSR.

Contents
The module is a "general adventure" which can be set anywhere. This module, set in a dangerous swamp, is designed for characters of level 7 to 9.

This module features an introduction for the Dungeon Master (DM) on the adventure; an Adventure Background for information for both the DM and the players; and finally a section guiding the DM through the encounters up to the resolution of the module.

Reception
Gene Alloway reviewed Swamplight in a 1993 issue of White Wolf. He stated that it has good content and "is a great adventure for the price". He also noted that it "should keep your players more than busy for a night. If this is the trend in adventures for this series, 1 am looking forward to the next". Overall, Alloway rated the module a 4 out of a possible 5.

References

Dungeons & Dragons modules
Role-playing game supplements introduced in 1993